Muirkirk is a passenger rail station on the MARC Camden Line between the District of Columbia's Washington Union Station and Baltimore's Camden Station. It is located at 7012-B Muirkirk Road over the bridge that carries Muirkirk Road above both the Camden Line and US 1.

Muirkirk station consists of two platforms with open shelters on both sides of the former Baltimore and Ohio Railroad Washington Division line. A concrete open storm drain runs beneath the northbound platform. Three pedestrian walkways cross over the storm drain as well as the tracks. US 1 runs behind the southbound platform which is protected by guard rails and a chain-link fence.

Station layout
The station has two side platforms and a large parking lot east of the tracks. The station is compliant with the Americans with Disabilities Act of 1990.

References

External links

 Station from Muirkirk Road from Google Maps Street View

Camden Line
Beltsville, Maryland
MARC Train stations
Former Baltimore and Ohio Railroad stations
Railway stations in Prince George's County, Maryland
Railway stations in the United States opened in 1994
1994 establishments in Maryland